Jacques Louis Marie Joseph Fihey (1 October 1931 – 12 March 2017) was a French Roman Catholic bishop.

Ordained to the priesthood in 1955, Fihey served as auxiliary bishop of the Roman Catholic Archdiocese of Marseille, France, from 1977 to 1989. He then served as bishop of the Roman Catholic Diocese of Coutances from 1989 to 2006.

Notes

1931 births
2017 deaths
20th-century Roman Catholic bishops in France
People from Narbonne
21st-century Roman Catholic bishops in France
Officiers of the Légion d'honneur